Kuznetsovsky is a rural locality (a khutor) in Krivle-Ilyushkinsky Selsoviet, Kuyurgazinsky District, Bashkortostan, Russia. The population was 10 as of 2010. There is 1 street.

Geography 
Kuznetsovsky is located 25 km east of Yermolayevo (the district's administrative centre) by road. Alexandrovsky is the nearest rural locality.

References 

Rural localities in Kuyurgazinsky District